The Tecnam P-Mentor is an Italian light aircraft, intended for  flight training, designed and produced by Tecnam of Casoria. It was introduced in April 2022 and is EASA CS-23 type certified in Europe.

The design was first unveiled at AERO Friedrichshafen 2022.

Design and development
The P-Mentor was designed to comply with the European Union Aviation Safety Agency EASA CS-23 regulations for certified light aircraft. It was EASA CS-23 certified on 7 April 2022.

The design features a cantilever low-wing, two-seats-in-side-by-side configuration enclosed cockpit under a bubble canopy, fixed tricycle landing gear with wheel pants and a single engine in tractor configuration, driving a two-bladed variable pitch propeller.

The aircraft wing has a light alloy spar and wing box, with a carbon-fibre-reinforced polymer leading edge. The  span wing is equipped with slotted flaps of 75% span, plus frise ailerons. The standard engine employed is the  Rotax 912iSc four-stroke certified powerplant.

The design uses a new tapered planform wing, employing a laminar flow airfoil, which meets the EASA CS-23 requirements for low speed handling and stall characteristics without a ballistic parachute, although a parachute is approved and available as a factory option.

The aircraft may be equipped for IFR flight. For training use it may be optionally equipped with a simulated retractable landing gear handle, although the landing gear does not actually retract.

Specifications

References

External links

2020s Italian civil utility aircraft
2020s Italian civil trainer aircraft
Single-engined tractor aircraft
Low-wing aircraft